Micah Brown (June 12, 1986, in Staten Island, New York) is a former professional Quarterback in Halifax, Nova Scotia who owns BATLX, a football-specific training and athletic development facility and the Halifax Harbour Hawks football program. Brown has played in the  Canadian Football League, German Football League, Arena Football leagues, the United States national American football team and Canadian University Football for the Saint Mary's Huskies.

High school
Born in Staten Island, NY, Brown moved to Tampa, FL and initially attended Tampa Bay Technical High School from 2000-2003. While at TBT (FL) he played basketball in addition to football. In the spring of 2003, his junior year, he transferred to Howard W. Blake High School, where he believed that he would have a better opportunity to go on and play college football. His junior and senior years he received All-District and All-County Honors along with Gatorade Player of the Year Award, Wendy's High School Heisman Award and the Elite 11 nominations.

Education
 Master's North American Studies from University of Marburg Germany
 Bachelor's Art Psychology & Sociology from Saint Mary's University (Halifax) Canada
 Bachelor's Science Marketing & Management from Saint Paul's College (Virginia)

Professional career
Brown was allocated to the Roosters in July 2015 a day after winning the Polish Super Final X with the Seahawks Gdynia, making him the second player ever in European-American Football history to win two major league championships in the same year once he captured the Maple Bowl title in Helsinki. Prior to his time in Poland, Brown was the offensive coordinator in addition to his role as quarterback, in Germany with the Marburg Mercenaries, where he kept the team in championship contention reaching the playoffs in the German Football League each his two years there.

Brown was introduced to Marburg through a former teammate on the U.S. National Team, which won Gold in the World Championship 2011 in Austria. Other professional playing, coaching and organization developmental experiences include Canadian Football League, Arena football and other countries such as Switzerland, France, India, Italy, Canada and USA.

References

1986 births
Living people
Sportspeople from Staten Island
Players of American football from New York City
Players of American football from Florida
American expatriate sportspeople in Canada
Players of Canadian football from New York (state)
Canadian football quarterbacks
American football quarterbacks
Saint Mary's Huskies football players
American expatriate sportspeople in Italy
American expatriate sportspeople in Finland
American expatriate sportspeople in Poland
American expatriate sportspeople in Germany
American expatriate sportspeople in Switzerland
German Football League players
American expatriate players of American football